Severn Bridge/Buck Lake Water Aerodrome  is located  west of Severn Bridge, Ontario, Canada.

References

Registered aerodromes in Ontario
Transport in the District Municipality of Muskoka
Seaplane bases in Ontario